José Lucílo Iturbe Arechiga  (31 October 1907 – May 1997) was a Mexican sprinter who competed in the 1928 Summer Olympics and in the 1932 Summer Olympics. He was born in Zacatecas, Zacatecas.

References

1907 births
1997 deaths
Mexican male sprinters
Mexican male middle-distance runners
People from Zacatecas City
Sportspeople from Zacatecas
Olympic athletes of Mexico
Athletes (track and field) at the 1928 Summer Olympics
Athletes (track and field) at the 1932 Summer Olympics
Competitors at the 1926 Central American and Caribbean Games
Competitors at the 1930 Central American and Caribbean Games
Central American and Caribbean Games gold medalists for Mexico
Central American and Caribbean Games medalists in athletics
20th-century Mexican people